Bryan Bridgewater (born September 7, 1970) is an American former sprinter.

Bridgewater started running for the West Valley Eagles youth club and Washington High School in Los Angeles. On the youth club he ran with Quincy Watts, but turned into a crosstown high school rival.  Often injured, Bridgewater put together an injury free senior year where he beat the future gold medalist and won the 200 metres at the 1988 CIF California State Meet over Watts and future NFL star Curtis Conway.  See the race on youtube.  He still holds Los Angeles City Section record in the 200m.                                                                                                                                                The following year, he won gold medals in the 100, 200 and 4x100 metres relay at the 1989 Pan American Junior Athletics Championships. California Junior College College State Champion in the 200m in 1990, while attending Long Beach City College. Inducted into Long Beach City College athletic hall of fame.
He was a four a time NCAA DII National Champion in the 100 and 200 meters while at California State Los Angeles. But in his senior year 1993 he was sanction for accepting money.  In which the NCAA could not prove. It was based on what someone said.
Bridgewater went to California State University, Los Angeles, winning the 100 and 200 at the 1993 NCAA Division II Championships.  He still holds the Div. II record in the 200.  Later that year he won gold medals in the 200 and 4x100 relay at the World University Games.  The year earlier, he was on the winning American team at the 1992 IAAF World Cup. He also member of the 1995 Pan American who competed in the 200m.

Bridgewater achieved two American top 10 rankings in the 200, overshadowed by world stars Carl Lewis, Michael Johnson, Michael Marsh and coincidentally Washington alum Jeff Williams.

References

1970 births
Living people
American male sprinters
Track and field athletes from Los Angeles
Athletes (track and field) at the 1995 Pan American Games
Pan American Games track and field athletes for the United States
Universiade medalists in athletics (track and field)
Universiade gold medalists for the United States
Medalists at the 1993 Summer Universiade